Grace Freedom Kwiyucwiny, also Grace Kwiyucwiny, is a Ugandan politicianwho serves as  the State Minister for Northern Uganda in the Ugandan Cabinet. She was appointed to that position on 6 June 2016. She also served as the woman  Member of Parliament representing the Zombo District.

Background and education
She was born in Zombo District, West Nile sub-region, in the Northern Region of Uganda. She attended Lower Zombo Primary School and Warr Girls School for her Uganda Certificate of Education(UCE), before transferring to Tororo Girls School for her Uganda Advanced Certificate of Education(UACE). She studied at Makerere University, graduating with a  Bachelor of Arts in Social Science, a Postgraduate Diploma in Management and a Master of Business Administration.

Career
She is an active community leader in her district, especially among women. She previously served as the chairperson of Nebbi women's community. She contested for the Nebbi Women's seat in parliament before and had lost. She contested again in Zombo District, after the two districts split and she won in 2011. She was re-elected in 2016. She lost in 2020 polls for Women's representative in the Parliament of Uganda for Zombo District. She was the first Woman Constituency Member of Parliament that Zombo District elected, since it was carved out of Nebbi District in 2009. On 6 June 2016, she was appointed State Minister for Northern Uganda.

Duties
One of the tasks she was handed as State Minister for Northern Uganda, was her selection to the committee to investigate the alleged plunder of Zoka Forest in Adjumani District. The four-person team, was selected by Prime Minister Ruhakana Rugunda, and is chaired by Mary Karooro Okurut, the Cabinet Minister for General Duties in the Office of the Prime Minister. Other members are Betty Amongi, the Minister for Lands, Housing and Urban Development and Sam Cheptoris, the Minister for Water and Environment.

See also
 Cabinet of Uganda
 Parliament of Uganda

References

Living people
Zombo District
People from Zombo District
Members of the Parliament of Uganda
Government ministers of Uganda
Northern Region, Uganda
Makerere University alumni
Women government ministers of Uganda
Women members of the Parliament of Uganda
Year of birth missing (living people)
People educated at Tororo Girls School
21st-century Ugandan politicians
21st-century Ugandan women politicians